Brother Cane is the debut studio album by American rock band Brother Cane. The album was released on May 10, 1993 through Virgin Records. This is the only release by the band with bassist Glenn Maxey; guitarist Roman Glick would switch to bass for Seeds and Wishpool.

Brother Cane peaked at #14 on the Billboard Heatseekers chart.

In 2010, Damon Johnson recorded his own version of "Hard Act to Follow" for his album Release.

Track listing

Personnel
Brother Cane
 Damon Johnson – lead vocals, guitar
 Roman Glick – guitar, backing vocals
 Glenn Maxey – bass, backing vocals
 Scott Collier – drums, percussion

Additional musicians
 Stephen Hanks – backing vocals
 Chuck Leavell – piano, organ
 Luenett McElroy – backing vocals
 Marc Phillips – keyboards
 Topper Price – harmonica
 Susan Snedecor – backing vocals

Production
 Marti Frederiksen – producer
 Jim Mitchell – producer, mixing, engineer
 Lee Bargeron – engineer
 Shawn Berman – engineer
 George Marino – mastering
 Tom Dolan – design
 Dennis Keeley – photography 
 Lee Peltier – art direction

References

1993 debut albums
Brother Cane albums
Virgin Records albums
Albums produced by Marti Frederiksen